Interstate 375 (I-375) in St. Petersburg, Florida, also known as North Bay Drive, is a  spur route from I-275 into downtown. It is also designated as the unsigned State Road 592 (SR 592). There is a sibling segment of freeway nearby that is designated I-175.

Route description

I-375 begins at an interchange with I-275 (exit 23), heading east toward downtown St. Petersburg, with interchanges with 8th Street North/9th Street North, before ending at 4th Avenue North west of 4th Street North. Westbound I-375 begins with a split of 5th Avenue North west of 4th Street North with no exits until reaching I-275. Along with its sister highway I-175, I-375 lacks exit numbers.

History

Original aspirations
I-375 was originally planned as a much longer state highway, extending west of I-275 and following a CSX rail line toward a proposed toll road near Clearwater. When I-75 was relocated in the late 1970s–early 1980s,  of additional Interstate became available, thus the St. Petersburg feeder sections of I-375 and the neighboring I-175 were upgraded to Interstate status. However, the Interstate Highway standards at the time would not allow the I-375 extension to receive federal Interstate Highway funding, leaving only the section east of I-275 built to freeway standards. The planned freeway extension of I-375 was canceled by officials at the Florida Department of Transportation (FDOT) in the mid-1970s. The cancelation of the rest of I-375 eventually resulted in US Highway 19 (US 19) between SR 694 (Gandy Boulevard) and the Pinellas–Pasco county line being upgraded to freeway standards.

Contrary to popular belief, the ramp stub at the I-375 interchange was not a result of the failed freeway extension. A connection to 20th Street North was originally planned from this stub. However, the 20th Street North and 5th Avenue North intersection was already convoluted prior to I-275's construction and FDOT decided not to build the connection as a result.

2007 tanker incident

On March 28, 2007, a tanker entering I-375 east from I-275 south's left exit lost control and hit the retaining wall, catching fire and burning for several hours. The resulting fire became so intense that it severely damaged a large section of the I-375 overpass from southbound I-275. Intense flames also fell to a city-owned (St. Petersburg) construction equipment yard and destroyed 8 to 10 city vehicles, causing an estimated $500,000 (equivalent to $ in ) in damage to the yard. The fire also spread to St. Petersburg's stormwater system, blowing off manhole covers within the vicinity. One St. Petersburg police officer was injured as a result being struck by one of those manhole covers.

In the end, the driver of the tanker died on scene due to the fire. The I-375 overpass remained closed for almost four weeks while FDOT rebuilt the damaged sections of the bridge, reopening to traffic on the morning of April 22, 2007, about one week ahead of schedule. Reconstruction of the I-375 overpass included the rebuilding of one entire span, plus 11 concrete beams. In addition, one of the support columns underwent significant repairs to ensure its strength in supporting the roadway. FDOT placed signs along I-275 south, indicating the left exit onto I-375, due to this, as well as other fatal incidents, that have occurred on the interchange.

Exit list

See also

References

External links

 Kurumi - I-375 Florida General Info
 Interstate 375 Florida page at Interstate275Florida.com  History and Photos

75-3 Florida
75-3
3 Florida
375
375
Expressways in the Tampa Bay area